Issa Rayyan (born August 24, 2000) is an American soccer player who plays for Las Vegas Lights in the USL Championship.

Career 
Rayyan appeared as an amateur player for United Soccer League side Bethlehem Steel FC during their 2017 season. Rayyan committed to play college soccer at Duke University in 2018. On February 26, 2019, Rayyan left Duke after just one season to sign a professional contract with Bethlehem Steel.

On March 16, 2021, Rayyan signed with USL Championship side Tacoma Defiance.

On December 16, 2021, Rayyan moved to USL Championship club Colorado Springs Switchbacks ahead of their 2022 season.

Rayyan was announced as a new signing for USL Championship side Las Vegas Lights on January 25, 2023.

Personal life
Rayyan was born in the United States to Jordanian parents.

References

External links 
 

2000 births
Living people
American soccer players
American people of Jordanian descent
Association football midfielders
Philadelphia Union II players
Duke Blue Devils men's soccer players
Soccer players from Michigan
Sportspeople from Dearborn, Michigan
Sportspeople from Grand Rapids, Michigan
USL Championship players
Tacoma Defiance players
Colorado Springs Switchbacks FC players
Las Vegas Lights FC players